Desulfovibrio alaskensis belongs to the sulfate-reducing bacteria. The type strain is Al1T (= NCIMB 13491T = DSM 16109T).

Biology
D. alaskensis has the ability to reduce radionuclides and heavy metals such as uranium and chromium to soluble and less toxic forms. The D. alaskensis strain G20 is an anaerobe with an optimal temperature range of 25C-40C. It is a gram negative microbe which is rod shaped, does not produce endospores, and is arranged in single cells. This strain is not known to cause any disease.

Genomics
Several strains of D. alaskensis have been sequenced: G20 (DOE JGI, 2007-2011Desulfovibrio alaskensis G20 in the GOLD database), RB2256, and DSM 16109 (DOE JGI 2013).

References

Further reading
 Staley, James T., et al. "Bergey’s manual of systematic bacteriology, vol. 3."Williams and Wilkins, Baltimore, MD (1989): 2250-2251.
 Bélaich, Jean-Pierre, Mireille Bruschi, and Jean-Louis Garcia, eds. Microbiology and biochemistry of strict Anaerobes Involved in interspecies hydrogen transfer. No. 54. Springer, 1990.

External links
 Desulfovibrio in the List of Prokaryotic names with Standing in Nomenclature''
 
Type strain of Desulfovibrio alaskensis at BacDive -  the Bacterial Diversity Metadatabase

Bacteria described in 2004
Desulfovibrio